This is a list of the British Conservative Party general election manifestos since 1900. From 1900 to 1945, the Conservative Party general election manifesto was usually published as a form of a short personal address by the leader of the party. From 1950 the party published a more formal document.

See also

Tamworth Manifesto
List of Labour Party (UK) general election manifestos
List of Liberal Party and Liberal Democrats (UK) general election manifestos
Conservative Party 2019 General Election Campaign
Our Society, Your Life

Further reading
 Iain Dale, Conservative Party general election manifestos, 1900–1997, Routledge, 2000,

References
Archive of Conservative Party Manifestos, 1900–2001
Party Manifestos

General election manifestos
Political manifestos
Party platforms